Madonna della Consolazione (Our Lady of Consolation) is an oil on panel painting by Perugino, datable ca. around 1496–1498. The work, completed in April 1498, was carried out in the Sala delle Udienze of the Collegio del Cambio. Since c. 1820 it is preserved in the National Gallery of Umbria in Perugia.

History 
The painting of the Mother of God under her title Our Lady of Consolation was accomplished for the Confraternita dei disciplinati di San Francesco in Perugia (lit: the Brotherhood of Disciples of Saint Francis in Perugia).

The figure of the Madonna is stylistically similar to works for which the artist's wife Chiara Fancelli modelled. Behind the Madonna and child are on both sides kneeling members of the brotherhood who wear their typical white cloaks with a badge. Above it are symmetrically arranged two angels in adoration, in the same manner as used for Perugino's San Francesco al Prato Resurrection, Madonna in Glory with Saints, Gonfalone della Giustizia and other works. The deep landscape background with a town in the distance is characteristic of the artist. He used a somewhat similar composition for the Tezi Altarpiece.

With the Napoleonic suppressions the Madonnna delle Consolatione was added to the collections of the National Gallery of Umbria.

References

Bibliography 
 Vittoria Garibaldi, Perugino, in Pittori del Rinascimento, Scala, Florence, 2004 
 Pierluigi De Vecchi, Elda Cerchiari, I tempi dell'arte, volume 2, Bompiani, Milan, 1999 
 Stefano Zuffi, Il Quattrocento, Electa, Milan, 2004 

Paintings of the Madonna and Child by Pietro Perugino
1498 paintings
Collections of the Galleria Nazionale dell'Umbria
Angels in art